Ponta Preta (Portuguese meaning "black point") may refer to several headlands in Cape Verde:

Ponta Preta (Maio), in the southwest of the island of Maio
Ponta Preta (Northern Sal), in the northwest of the island of Sal 
Ponta Preta (Southern Sal), in the southwest of the island of Sal
Ponta Preta (Santiago), in the northwest of the island of Santiago
Ponta Preta Lighthouse, on Santiago